Justice Denied is the only regularly published print magazine in the world solely devoted to issues related to wrongful convictions. The magazine prints stories about wrongful convictions, miscarriages of justice, and criminal justice issues related to prosecution and conviction of innocent people in countries around the world.

Details
Justice Denied was founded in 1998 as a volunteer, non-profit magazine to promote awareness of wrongful convictions, and their causes and preventions. Its first issue was in February 1999, and the two original co-publishers were Stormy Thoming-Gale and Clara Boggs.

On January 1, 2011 Justice Denied became an Internet only publication with the current issue and all back issues available online for no charge.

A complete index of the more than 1,000 articles published in Justice Denied related to wrongful convictions in every state in the United States and dozens of other countries is available on its website.

See all
 List of wrongful convictions in the United States

References

External links
 
Database of more than 3,000 wrongly convicted people
Bibliography of more than 400 books, articles, films and documentary references related to wrongful convictions

1998 establishments in the United States
2011 disestablishments in the United States
Online magazines published in the United States
Bimonthly magazines published in the United States
Defunct magazines published in the United States
Legal magazines
Magazines established in 1998
Magazines disestablished in 2011
Online magazines with defunct print editions
+
Wrongful conviction advocacy